Florian Johann Deller (bapt. 2 May 1729 in Drosendorf, Lower Austria – 19 September 1773 in Munich) was an Austrian composer and violinist.

Life
In 1751 he was a violinist at the court orchestra in Stuttgart. There he studied with Niccolo Jommelli. Later he became assistant to the ballet master Jean Georges Noverre and composed operas and ballets. In 1769 he was appointed Concertmaster and Hofcompositeur. In 1771 he moved to Vienna. Deller died in 1773 in the monastery of the Brothers of Mercy in Munich.

His compositional output consists mostly of operas, ballet music, sonatas and minuets. He enjoyed in his lifetime a high reputation as a composer. His works have been greatly appreciated, by, among others Mozart and Christian Friedrich Daniel Schubart. Many of his works are considered lost.

Works
 Operas
 Il tamburo notturno, 1765
 Le Contese per amore, 1770
 Il Maestro di Capella, 1771
 La contadina nelle corte
 5 other Comic Operas
 Ballets
Admète et Alceste (Noverre), Stuttgart, 1761  
La mort d'Hercule (Noverre), Stuttgart, 1762 
Orfée et Euridice (Noverre), Stuttgart, 1763  
Der Sieg des Neptun (Noverre), Stuttgart, 1763
Apollon et Daphne (Lauchery), Kassel, 1764 
Ballo di Alessandro (Noverre), Stuttgart, 1765
Pan et Syrinx (Lauchery), Kassel, 1766
Le feste d'Imeneo (Noverre), Stuttgart, 1766
Enée et Lavinie (Noverre), Stuttgart 1761-1766 
Pigmalion ou La statuë animée (Lauchery), Kassel, 1767 
Titon et l'Aurore (Lauchery), Kassel, 1767
La pauvre (D'Auvigny) to opera Fetonte by Niccolo Jommelli, Ludwigsburg, 1768
Il matrimonio improvviso (D'Auvigny) to opera La schiava liberata by Niccolo Jommelli, Ludwigsburg, 1768
Le astuzie della fata Urgela (D'Auvigny) to opera La schiava liberata by Niccolo Jommelli, Ludwigsburg, 1768
Telephe et Isménie ou La mort d'Eurite, Kassel, 1768
Hylas et Eglée, ou La fête d'amour (Lauchery), Kassel, 1769
Le ballet allégorique (D'Auvigny) to opera Calliroe by Antonio Sacchini, Ludwigsburg, 1770
La constance (D'Auvigny) to opera L’amore in musica by Antonio Boroni, Solitude, 1770
Le ballet polonois (D'Auvigny) to opera L’amore in musica by Antonio Boroni, Solitude, 1770
L'embarquement pour Cythère, ou Le triomphe de Venus, Kassel, 1770
Le rival imaginaire, Mannheim, 1774; 
Die Leiden des jungen Werther (Der junge Werther), Pressburg, 1777 
La mariée de village, Kassel, 1784;
1 without title
 Instrumental
6 Sonatas, 2 vn, vc, hpd, London, 1780
Chaconne for pf
4 symphonies
2 flute concertos

Sources
Rudolf Krauss: Das Stuttgarter Hoftheater von den ältesten Zeiten bis zur Gegenwart (1908)

External links
 

1729 births
1773 deaths
People from Horn District
Austrian Classical-period composers
18th-century classical composers
18th-century Austrian male musicians
Austrian male classical composers